Mustajärvi is a Finnish surname, meaning "black lake". Notable people with the surname include:

 Pate Mustajärvi (born 1956), Finnish rock singer
 Markus Mustajärvi (born 1963), Finnish politician

Finnish-language surnames